Motif (also known as Motif Volume 1) is a 2008 album by guitarist Steve Howe.  The album features re-recordings of songs from Howe's career, including pieces from his solo albums as well as Sketches in the Sun from GTR and Clap from The Yes Album

Track listing

References 

2008 albums
Steve Howe (musician) albums